Lars Arne Nilsen (born 6 April 1964) is a Norwegian football coach who is the head coach of 1. divisjon club Aalesunds FK.

Nilsen is from Sotra in Fjell municipality. He played for Stord Sunnhordland FK as a young player and was the club's top scorer in 1988, the year he scored the 1–0 goal in the promotion battle to the top division against Os TF. He played for Sogndal from 1989 to 1990, Nest-Sotra from 1991 to 1994 and Volda from 1995 where he also coached. In 1999, he was coach of the Ørsta IL. From 2008, he was assistant coach for IL Hødd, under Einar Magne Skeide. Nilsen was promoted to head coach ahead of the 2010 season and led the team to victory in the 2012 Norwegian Football Cup, in a season where the team was in the second tier and barely saved from relegation. He resigned from his position in November 2013.

After Nilsen took over as head coach of SK Brann in 2015, he led the team to 2nd place and direct promotion from 1. divisjon. In 2016, he secured 2nd place and silver medal in Brann's first season back in Tippeligaen, and was also chosen as the coach of the year in Tippeligaen.
After two years of poor results he was sacked in August 2020.

Personal life
Nilsen is the brother of former Vålerenga player, Nest-Sotra and Brann II coach Helge Nilsen, and the father of footballer Sivert Heltne Nilsen who also played in Hødd under his father's management, but as in 2013 went on to play for Vålerenga. In 2015, he went to SK Brann, again under his father's management.

Honours

Manager 

Hødd
 Norwegian Cup: 2012

Individual
 Tippeligaen Coach of the Year: 2016

References

Living people
1964 births
Norwegian footballers
Norwegian football managers
Sogndal Fotball players
SK Brann managers
Aalesunds FK managers
Eliteserien managers
People from Øygarden
Association footballers not categorized by position
Sportspeople from Vestland